Triking is the common name for the Triking Sports Cars, the United Kingdom based manufacturer of the 3-wheeled Triking Cyclecar, located in Hingham, Norfolk, formerly in Marlingford, Norfolk. Trikings are essentially a modern version of the 1930s Morgan three-wheelers, and a cross between a sports car and a microcar.

History

Triking Sports Cars was founded as Triking Cyclecars Ltd by former Lotus employee Tony Divey (1930 - 2013). He built the first Triking in the late 1970s because he was unable to acquire a Morgan. It featured a steel space frame with alloy panels and a glass-fibre bonnet, and was powered by a Moto Guzzi V-twin motorcycle engine. Its popularity led to production. In 1990 Divey designed a new tubular front end and a one piece glass-fibre "body".

Telegraph writer, Andrew English, commented of the Triking driving experience: "The intimacy is both profound, delightful and, for the claustrophobic, disturbing. Everything is so contiguous with the driver; you could have sex at a greater distance than this."

Triking Cyclecars Ltd was dissolved in 2006 upon Divey's retirement and was reformed in 2009 by Alan Layzell, a Triking employee.

See also
 List of car manufacturers of the United Kingdom
 Three-wheeler
 Cyclecar
 Motorcycle motor powered car
 List of motorized trikes
 Morgan 3-Wheeler

Notes

External links

Triking Sports Cars official site
Triking at 3wheelers.com
Triking Owners Forum
Alan Layzell and Triking Sports Cars
Facebook Triking Owners Club

Microcars
Sports cars
Car manufacturers of the United Kingdom
Cars powered by 2-cylinder engines
Three-wheeled motor vehicles
Hingham, Norfolk